Maria Otto (6 August 1892, Weiden in der Oberpfalz - 20 December 1977, Munich) was the first female attorney in Germany. Following the enactment of Germany's "Law on the Admission of Women to the Offices and Professions of Justice" on 11 July 1922, Maria Otto was admitted to the bar on 7 December 1922. Until her death in 1977, she worked as a lawyer in Munich.

References

1892 births
1977 deaths
20th-century German lawyers
Jurists from Bavaria
People from Munich